Dave Kellett is the creator and cartoonist of two webcomic titles, Sheldon and Drive, and the co-author of How To Make Webcomics.

Early years and education
Kellett is a southern California native. He graduated from the University of Notre Dame with a bachelor's degree in English and Spanish. While there, he produced the daily comic strip Four Groups of the Apocalypse for the student newspaper The Observer. He earned a master's degree from University of California, San Diego in Literature with his thesis, "To draw in the crowd : the cartoon and the 'public sphere' of eighteenth-century England." He received the Rotary Foundation Ambassadorial Scholarship, to attend the University of Kent at Canterbury in England (within the Centre for Cartooning and Caricature Studies). There, he earned a master's degree in History of cartoon art propaganda with his thesis, "Philip Zec: Cartoonist in a Propaganda War."

Career
Dave Kellett is the creator behind the successful web comics:  Sheldon about a 10-year-old computer genius billionaire, and the sci-fi strip Drive.   The author of twelve comic books, and the co-author of the Harvey-Award-nominated book How To Make Webcomics, Kellett regularly speaks around the country on the subject of cartooning in new media.

In 2014, Kellet released the comics documentary Stripped, produced with twice-Sundance-nominated cinematographer, Fred Schroeder.  He has been an invited speaker at Savannah College of Art & Design, the Society of Illustrators, Ohio State’s triennial Festival of Cartoon Art, the Charles M. Schulz Museum, the San Francisco Cartoon Art Museum, Loyola Marymount University, South by Southwest Festival (SxSW), San Diego Comic-Con, New York Comic-Con, Seattle’s Emerald City Comicon and more.  His cartoons have appeared in the Los Angeles Times, San Diego Union-Tribune, and dozens of others.

Kellett holds two master's degrees in the art and history of cartooning: First, at the University of California San Diego; and then at the University of Kent, UK, at its Centre for Cartoon and Caricature Studies, on a full academic scholarship from the Rotary Foundation.  After working for Mattel Toys as the head writer and a senior toy designer for 8 years, Dave pursued cartooning full-time in 2007.  Dave started Sheldon in 1998 and Drive in 2009.

Awards
 Winner, 2015 National Cartoonists' Society On-line comics - Short Form Silver Reuben Award for Sheldon.
 Nominated for an Eisner Award in 2011
Nominated for a Harvey Award in 2009
Finalist, Scripps Howard Foundation National Journalism Award (College Cartooning)
Rotary Foundation Ambassadorial Scholar

Authored books
Kellett has authored the following books:

Still Got It: The Seventh Sheldon Collection 
Living Dangerously With Saturated Fats: The Sixth Sheldon Collection 
Nerds On Parade: The Fifth Sheldon Collection 
Pugs: God's Little Weirdos 
A Blizzard of Lizards: The Fourth Sheldon Collection 
62% More Awesome: The Third Sheldon Collection
The Good, The Bad & The Pugly: The Second Sheldon Collection 
Pure Ducky Goodness: The First Sheldon Collection 
A Well Balanced Meal: The Very Best of: Four Food Groups of the Apocalypse 

He also co-authored the book How to Make Webcomics.

Acting and other projects
Kellett was a part of the sketch comedy group And Donkey Makes Five from Los Angeles, California. He also performed in Comedy Central's South Beach Comedy Festival in Miami in 2009. Kellett has performed on stage in Skirts and Flirts in New York and in Los Angeles. He also performed in Der Inka von Peru at the George Wood Theatre in London.

Kellett was a co-host of the comics-focused podcast, Webcomics Weekly.

References

External links
"Freeing of the Comics"
 Official Sheldon website
 Webcomics Weekly
 Half Pixel
 Drive Comic website

American cartoonists
American webcomic creators
Living people
University of Notre Dame alumni
University of California, San Diego alumni
Alumni of the University of Kent
Year of birth missing (living people)